Adelebsen is a railway station located in Adelebsen, Germany. The station is located on the Oberweserbahn. The train services are operated by NordWestBahn.

Train services
The station is served by the following services:

Regional services  Ottbergen – Bad Karlshafen – Bodenfelde – Göttingen

References

Railway stations in Lower Saxony